Kavya's Diary is a  Telugu film released in 2009. Directed by V.K.Prakash, the film stars Manjula Ghattamaneni, Charmy Kaur, Shashank, Indrajith, Satyam Rajesh and Leena. The film was made with a small budget of Rs. 4 Crores. The movie is heavily inspired by the 1992 Hollywood thriller The Hand That Rocks the Cradle.

Plot
Raj (Indrajeet) and Pooja (Manjula Swaroop) are a married couple who move into a new house with their children. Desperate for a nanny to take care of their children, they hire Kavya who is unemployed, after she saves Pooja's life. Kavya grows close to the family and they come to consider her part of the family. However, as the movie progresses, it is revealed that Kavya was the wife of Kiran; a gynecologist who committed suicide after Pooja accused him of sexually assaulting her. Other patients supported this claim and he eventually committed suicide. In an attempt to save him, Kavya accidentally miscarries. She eventually tries to destroy the family and kill Pooja to get revenge for her loss. Kavya dies by drowning when she was about to kill Pooja.The movie is a remake of the English movie, 'The Hand that Rocks the Cradle'.

Cast
 Manjula Ghattamaneni as Pooja: Raj's wife, the protagonist.
 Charmy Kaur as Kavya: Kiran's widow, the antagonist.
 Shashank as Abhi
 Indrajith as Raj
 Satyam Rajesh as Athi D
 Dr. Bharath Reddy as Kiran, Kavya's husband

Soundtrack

Music was composed by Manu Ramesan and released by Aditya Music.

References

External links

 
 http://www.idlebrain.com/movie/archive/mr-kavyasdiary.html

2009 films
2000s Tamil-language films
Films directed by V. K. Prakash